Flowed Lands is a  lake located in the Adirondack High Peaks in Essex County, New York.

References

Colden
Adirondack Park
Colden